The United Kingdom Census 1901 was the 11th nationwide census conducted in the United Kingdom of Great Britain and Ireland, and was done on 31 March 1901 "relating to the persons returned as living at midnight on Sunday, March 31st".

The total population of the England and Wales, Scotland, and Ireland (including what is now the Republic of Ireland) was 41,458,721 of which 21,356,313 were female and 20,102,406 were male. The foreign-born population was recorded at 1.4%

Geographic scope
It was divided into three parts: England and Wales, Scotland, and Ireland. The census in England, Wales and Scotland was legislated for by the Census (Great Britain) Act 1900. The England and Wales part of the census contains records for 32 million people and 6 million houses. Certain parts of the records have suffered damage and therefore some information is missing, but it is largely complete with the exception of parts of Deal in Kent.

The census of England and Wales does not include the census of Scotland. The Isle of Man is included in the England and Wales returns.  The data for the census of Scotland is held in a different location to that of the England and Wales census.

Prior to the secession of the Irish Free State, the whole of Ireland engaged in the census on the same night, however none of the census returns from Ireland for the 19th century still exist, except for partial returns. The 1901 census is the first complete surviving census, and is available online. The census in Ireland was legislated for by the Census (Ireland) Act 1900.

Information included
The entries for households on the census returns for 1901 fall under the following headings:
 Road, street, town or village, number or name of house
 Whether the house is inhabited or not
 Name and surname of each person
 Relation to Head of Family
 Condition as to marriage
 Age last birthday
 Profession or occupation
 Whether employed or not
 Where born
 Whether deaf and dumb, blind, lunatic, imbecile or feeble-minded
 Also crews of Vessels and residents of Institutions.

The term "idiot" on the 1891 census was replaced by the term "feeble-minded".

Online access
The census data was published online in 2003 on a site run by The National Archive. Since then the data has also been available on other sites on a subscription basis. The data is mainly used by genealogists, family historians, name researchers and anyone wanting to know more about their Welsh and English ancestors in 1901. It can also be used to research hamlets, villages and parishes to build a historical perspective.

See also
Census in the United Kingdom
Census Enumerators' Books

References and sources
References

Sources
 Census of England and Wales (63 Vict. C. 4.) 1901: General Report with Appendices (Great Britain. Census Office. H.M. Stationery Office, 1904) p302

British genealogy websites
1901
Census
April 1901 events